Illbleed is a survival horror video game developed by Crazy Games and released for the Dreamcast in 2001. It was published by Crazy Games in Japan and Amusement Interface Associate (AIA) in North America. The game tells the story of Eriko Christy, a high school student exploring a new horror-themed amusement park in town to find her friends who have gone missing within. Eriko, as well as her friends, must explore six haunted house attractions based on fictional horror movies, detecting and neutralizing hidden traps and enemies which can harm or frighten them to death.

Crazy Games was known as Climax Graphics until a month before Illbleed's release. As Climax Graphics, the studio had developed and published Blue Stinger (1999), an action-adventure game for the Dreamcast. The team wanted to explore horror themes in their next game, and so drew inspiration from haunted house attractions and horror films to create an original scenario to differentiate it from other horror games.

Illbleed was released in the months following Sega's discontinuation of the Dreamcast. The game received mixed reviews. It was praised for its original concept, dark humor, camp style, and horror B movie qualities, but criticized for its game design, controls, and overall playability. It was a commercial failure, only matching a tenth of Blue Stinger's sales figures. A port for the Xbox was planned but ultimately cancelled.

Gameplay

Illbleed is a survival horror game. The player must explore six stages, each an amusement park attraction themed after a different fictional horror movie, and complete the objectives unique to each one. The player begins by controlling protagonist Eriko Christy, but may rescue and recruit more playable characters as they progress, each with different strengths and weaknesses.

In a departure from other survival horror games of the era, Illbleed features less of an emphasis on combat, and a greater emphasis on locating and neutralizing traps. The location of traps in the stage, as well as enemies and items, is random. Different types of traps and enemies may affect the player characters's stamina, heart rate, or bleeding rate. Physical damage will reduce stamina and increase bleeding, while frightening moments will increase their heart rate. High bleeding rates will cause the character's stamina and heart rate to fall. If the bleeding reaches a certain threshold, or they lose all their stamina, the character will die. If their heart rate increases too much, they will die of a heart attack, or they will faint if it drops too low. If the player fails to keep the character alive, they must continue with another available character. Dead characters can be revived outside the level. If there are no remaining characters, the game ends and must be restarted from the previous save point.

To avoid hazards, the player must watch a sensory feedback monitor which indicates the senses of sight, hearing, smell and a sixth sense. Each time the player gets near an item or potential hazard, different senses may react on the sensory monitor. To dismantle traps, the player must use the Horror Monitor, which can be found near the beginning of each stage. The Horror Monitor allows the player to mark areas for potential traps, items, and enemies at the cost of adrenaline. The player can then survey any spot marked. If a trap was there, it will be successfully defused and the spent adrenaline will be returned to the character. If it was an item, the player can collect it. Marking enemies will grant the player a first strike advantage going into battle. Engaging enemies will place the game into a combat mode with unique controls. The player must either neutralize the enemy or escape by calling for a helicopter from a helipad. Winning a battle will grant the character adrenaline.

Items may be found throughout levels, or purchased at the park's grandstand, which serves as a hub world. Items may just be text that tells the story, event items needed to complete a stage objective, or recovery items that can heal the player character. The player can also purchase recovery items and character upgrades from the "Emergency Room" in each stage and the hub world.

Plot 
The main protagonist is high school student and horror-aficionado Eriko Christy. As a child, Eriko's family ran a "horror caravan", a traveling horror-themed amusement attraction. Her father would test out horror gimmicks on her when she was a child, traumatizing her. When she was six-years-old, her mother divorced her father and took Eriko, estranging the relationship between Eriko and her father. One day, in the present, Eriko's friends Kevin, Randy, and Michel invite here to a recently opened horror amusement park – "Illbleed". Its creator, horror movie producer Michael Reynolds, is offering an absurd reward of $100,000,000 to anyone who can successfully reach the end of the park. Eriko declines the invitation, assuming it to be a cheap publicity stunt. Her three friends excitedly set out for the park, leaving her with her ticket. After a few days without hearing from her friends, Eriko goes to the park to investigate.

In the park, Eriko explores haunted house attractions themed after horror films. While exploring the attractions, she has the opportunity to save each of her friends. Depending on how many of her friends she saves, the game has multiple endings. If Eriko saves all three friends and a reporter named Jorg, Eriko and her friends win the prize money, but Eriko states that she is going back to Illbleed and tells them not to follow. If Eriko fails to rescue one of the characters, Eriko wins the prize money but her friend(s) remain dead. She wishes she could give up the prize money to bring her friends back. Playing the game a second time, and not saving anyone, will reveal the true ending that Michael Reynolds is actually Eriko's father. Eriko defeats her father in the final battle.

Development
Illbleed was developed by Tokyo-based game developer Crazy Games, under leadership from company founder and producer Shinya Nishigaki. The company was known as Climax Graphics until one month before the game's release. Development on Illbleed began after completion of their first game, Blue Stinger (1999). The team considered making a sequel to Blue Stinger, and was even asked by Sega to do so after the game's commercial success in the West, but Crazy Games elected to make an original horror game. Production of Illbleed occurred in Shinjuku, Tokyo and lasted a year and a half. At its peak, Crazy Games had 23 staff working on the game. Programmer Kazuaki Yokozawa designed a new engine for the game in an effort to alleviate many of the issues in Blue Stinger, such as the camera. It also allowed for higher frame rates, more effects, and more objects on screen.

The team had avoided horror elements in Blue Stinger to set it apart from horror adventure games on the market like Resident Evil, but they decided to wholly embrace horror for their new game. Horror media was in the middle of a renaissance at the time, owing success to films such as Ring (1998) and Spiral (1998) in Japan, and Scream (1996) in the United States. Wanting to create a game with jump scares, the team decided on creating an elaborate haunted house game, simulating the haunted house attractions seen in amusement parks. They visited haunted house attractions at Fuji-Q Highland in Yamanashi for inspiration, and studied how such attractions are designed to play with attendees' expectations. They also pulled influence from 1980s American horror films and B movies. Nishigaki, a film aficionado, also cited the directorial styles of James Cameron, Steven Spielberg, George Lucas, Hayao Miyazaki, and Akira Kurosawa as influences.

Release 
The game was announced in April 2000 at Tokyo Game Show. A playable demo was demonstrated at E3 that year and at the Tokyo Game Show in September 2000. Although Crazy Games originally expected Sega to localize the game due to Blue Stinger's success, Sega of America dropped Illbleed from its localization lineup in mid-2000, citing a crowded first-party release schedule. Sega felt it was a strong game and would get picked up by a third-party publisher, and as expected, Crazy Games soon had offers from five different publishers to localize. The rights ultimately went to Jaleco. Plans were soon canceled however as Jaleco was struggling financially and was bought out by PCCW that same year. Former Jaleco executives founded Amusement Interface Associate (AIA) and its subsidiary AIA USA in early 2001 which ultimately localized the game.

Illbleed was self-published by Crazy Games in Japan on March 29, 2001 for the Dreamcast, two months after Sega announced it was discontinuing the platform. It was released in North America by AIA USA one month later.  An official Chinese-language edition was released in January 2002. The game was a commercial failure, only selling 50,000 copies worldwide, a tenth of Blue Stinger's sales. Crazy Games also released an action figure of Eriko Christy, limited to 1,000 figures.

Ports of Illbleed and Blue Stinger were under development for the Xbox by Japanese developer Coolnet Entertainment. Despite Illbleed being reportedly 90% complete, the ports were cancelled due to Nishigaki's death in 2004, and the Xbox's poor success in Japan.

Reception

The game received "mixed or average" reviews according to video game review aggregator Metacritic. Many critics praised the game's willingness to stray from the survival horror tropes that had become formulaic. Electronic Gaming Monthly (EGM) wrote that Illbleed "picks up the dying survival horror torch, douses it in gasoline, and throws it into your treehouse, laughing all the while". Next Generation described the survival horror genre as becoming "almost as ubiquitous as first-person shooters", and felt Illbleed successfully set itself apart. GameSpy agreed, saying the genre needed some kind of innovation, and felt that Illbleed's new gameplay elements and unique humor made it original.

The game's most-praised elements were its campy B movie style, twisted dark humor, and gratuitous use of blood. GameSpot called the game's offbeat presentation its most redeeming quality, writing that "gratuitous use of luscious, spurting blood sets its B movie tone perfectly". EGM described the game as "psychotically gorgeous" and "freaking bizarre". Dreamcast Magazine (UK) attempted to sum up the game in one word, "excess", explaining that everything in the game was "insane" and "over-the-top". Both GameSpy and GameSpot observed how the game was self-aware of how cheesy it was and fully embraced it. While the voice acting was panned by EGM and GameSpy, Dreamcast Magazine felt it contributed to its campy quality. Both EGM and Next Generation wrote that the game had a low budget feel which made the game itself B grade quality in the same vein as the B movies that inspired it.

Illbleed's game design and controls were criticized. Critics pointed out the stiff jump mechanics, the stark difference between walking and running, and the camera system as all contributing to frustration. IGN wrote that it can be difficult to enjoy the game while these issues continue interrupting the experience. Edge described the room-to-room exploration as a repetitive "minesweeping" exercise of tagging traps, but felt it worked generally well except for a lack of checkpoints. Both GameSpot and GameSpy criticized what they called "stop and go" pacing: needing to stop and scan rooms for traps upon entering them, before being able to proceed.

Critics ultimately recommended the game to players who can appreciate schlock horror and ignore the game's technical flaws. GameSpot wrote that whether players enjoy the game depends on their "affinity for slapstick horror" and "tolerance for tedium." Producer Shinya Nishigaki said of the reception: "Illbleed requires a high degree of intelligence to play [...] It was just an entire mix of entertainment that many people couldn't understand. To me, the negative reviews of the game did not affect me at all."

Notes

References

External links

 (English)
 (Japanese)

2001 video games
Action-adventure games
Cancelled Xbox games
Dreamcast games
Dreamcast-only games
2000s horror video games
Jaleco games
Single-player video games
Video games developed in Japan
Video games featuring female protagonists